Nasreen Qadri (born September 2, 1986) better known as Nasrin Kadri is an Arab-Israeli singer of traditional and pop Middle Eastern and Mizrahi music. Qadri, a Muslim convert to Judaism, mostly sings in Hebrew, but also performs Arabic songs, among them the songs of Umm Kulthum.

Biography
Nasreen Qadri was born in Haifa, Israel, to Muslim Arab-Israeli parents. Her father was a taxi driver and her mother was a nurse. She was raised in Lod. For a decade, Qadri was in a relationship with the Jewish-Israeli musician Aviezer Ben Moha. She began a formal conversion process to Judaism. In July 2017 the couple became engaged. In September 2017, they broke up and canceled the wedding.

She completed her conversion to Judaism in 2018 and took the Hebrew name "Bracha", meaning "blessing". According to news reports her conversion is not recognized by the Chief Rabbinate or the Israeli Interior Ministry because it was carried out by a rabbi independent of the authorities.

Singing career
In 2011, after performing for years in small clubs and bars, she won the television star search program Eyal Golan Is Calling You.

Her debut album appeared in 2014.

In 2017, she was invited by Israeli culture minister Miri Regev to perform at the Sultan's Pool in Jerusalem in a ceremony marking Yom HaZikaron, Israeli Memorial Day. In July 2017, she shared the stage with Radiohead when the band appeared in Israel.

On September 4, 2018, she released her third album Learning to Walk. That same year she re-recorded the song "Goral Ehad" by Ofra Haza, for an album that honored Ofra Haza. On January 28, 2019, she released the song "Yishma-HaEl," which describes the difficult period she underwent following her conversion.

In 2019, Qadri was a judge on the fifth season of The Voice Israel. In 2020, Qadri performed at the central 72nd Israel Independence Day ceremonies on Mount Herzl.

Discography

Albums
2014:  (Nasreen Qadri)
2016:  (Calling You)
2018:  (Learning to Walk)

Songs
 2012: 
 2017: 

Featured in
 "Sawah" (Offer Nissim Remix)

See also
Music of Israel

References

External links
 Facebook
 YouTube

Palestinian Jews
1987 births
Palestinian women singers
21st-century Israeli women singers
Palestinian former Muslims
Palestinian pop singers
Israeli pop singers
People from Lod
Living people
People from Haifa
Converts to Judaism from Islam
Arab Jews
Arab citizens of Israel